Pascal Fauvel (8 April 1882 – 22 October 1942) was a French archer who competed in the 1920 Summer Olympics. In 1920 he won three Olympic medals, two silver and one bronze in team competitions.

References

External links
Pascal Fauvel's profile at databaseOlympics
Pascal Fauvel's profile at Sports Reference.com

1882 births
1942 deaths
French male archers
Olympic archers of France
Archers at the 1920 Summer Olympics
Olympic silver medalists for France
Olympic bronze medalists for France
Olympic medalists in archery
Medalists at the 1920 Summer Olympics
20th-century French people